Brad Teare (born 1956) is a Utah-based landscape artist working in oils, acrylics, and woodcuts.

Teare was educated at University of Idaho and Utah State University. He subsequently moved to New York City where he freelanced for The New York Times.

Teare is a landscape painter and noted woodcut artist. In 2006 his woodblock print "Rock Moss" won the Deseret Morning News $2,500 Purchase Award.

Teare has done book covers for James Michener and Anne Tyler. In 1992, he created a comic called Cypher, later published as a book. A spin-off comic, The Subterranean, has subsequently been created and released online. His comics work is of a similar caliber to Jim Woodring's Frank and Gary Panter's Jimbo.

In 1997, he illustrated Dance, Pioneer, Dance!, a children's book by Rick Walton about westbound American pioneers, written in verse resembling a caller's chant for a square dance at a hoedown.

Teare worked as an artist for The Friend, children's magazine of the LDS Church, until his retirement in late 2018, and teaches occasional courses through Weber State University and on his YouTube channel that has had over 1.7 million views. He was married to the late American trompe-l'œil artist Debra Teare.

References

External links
 

American Latter Day Saints
University of Idaho alumni
Utah State University alumni
1956 births
Living people